Holiday in Tyrol ( or ) is a 1956 West German drama film directed by Wolfgang Schleif and starring Hans Söhnker, Edith Mill and Michael Ande. It was shot at the Bavaria Studios in Munich and on location in Bavaria, Austria and Switzerland. The film's sets were designed by the art directors Hans Ledersteger and Ernst Richter.

Main cast
 Hans Söhnker as Robert von Stetten
 Edith Mill as Anna Retzer
 Michael Ande as Rosmarin von Stetten / Thymian Retzer
 Therese Giehse as Mutter Lindner, Witwe
 Irene von Meyendorff as Charlie
 Beppo Brem as Bürgermeister Kunzel
 Wastl Witt as Herr Kramer
 Lina Carstens as Frau Kramer
 William Trenk as Franz, Diener
 Petra Unkel as Vroni
 Marianne Brandt as Huberbäuerin
 Bruno Hübner as Dorflehrer
 Erika von Thellmann as Frieda
 Erna Großmann as Klara
 Maren Bielenberg as Beate

References

Bibliography 
 Parish, James Robert. Film Actors Guide. Scarecrow Press, 1977.

External links 
 

1956 films
1956 drama films
German drama films
West German films
1950s German-language films
Films directed by Wolfgang Schleif
Films based on German novels
Films set in the Alps
Films shot at Bavaria Studios
1950s German films
German black-and-white films